José-Miguel Bernardo Herranz (born 12 March 1950) is a Spanish mathematician and statistician. A noted Bayesian, since 1978 he has been a professor of statistics at the University of Valencia.

Bernardo was born in Valencia, Spain. He received a PhD in mathematics from the University of Valencia in 1974, and a second PhD in statistics from University College London in 1976.

He is a Fellow of the American Statistical Association and was founding co-president of the International Society for Bayesian Analysis (ISBA).

Bibliography
Bernardo, J. M. (1981). Bioestadística: Una Perspectiva Bayesiana. Barcelona: Vicens-Vives. pdf
Bernardo, J. M. and Smith, A. F. M. (1994). Bayesian Theory. Chichester: Wiley.

References

External links
Bernardo's homepage on website of the University of Valencia
 

Living people
1950 births
20th-century Spanish mathematicians
Bayesian statisticians
Fellows of the American Statistical Association
Spanish statisticians
21st-century Spanish mathematicians